The Agusta AZ.8L, or Agusta-Zappata AZ.8L, was an Italian airliner prototype first flown on 9 June 1958. It was of conventional low-wing monoplane configuration with tricycle undercarriage and all-metal construction. Filippo Zappata's design grew out of a twin-engined transport designated AZ.1 that was never built.

When the AZ.8L failed to attract customers, Agusta abandoned the project to focus on its helicopter manufacturing operations, in particular a new Zappata design, the A.101.

Operators

Italian Air Force

Specifications

See also

References

Further reading

 
 

Agusta aircraft
1950s Italian airliners
Aircraft first flown in 1958
Four-engined tractor aircraft
Low-wing aircraft
Four-engined piston aircraft